Miltochrista expressa is a moth of the family Erebidae. It was described by Hiroshi Inoue in 1988. It is found in Taiwan.

References

 

expressa
Moths described in 1988
Moths of Taiwan